Herbert Ritts Jr. (August 13, 1952December 26, 2002) was an American fashion photographer and director known for his photographs of celebrities, models, and other cultural figures throughout the 1980s and 1990s. His work concentrated on black and white photography and portraits, often in the style of classical Greek sculpture, which emphasized the human shape.

Early life and education 
Born in Los Angeles, to a Jewish family, Ritts began his career working in the family furniture business. His father, Herb Ritts Sr., was a businessman, while his mother, Shirley Ritts, was an interior designer. He moved to the East Coast to attend Bard College in New York, where he majored in economics and art history, graduating in 1975.

Career 
Later, while living in Los Angeles, he became interested in photography when he and friend Richard Gere, then an aspiring actor, decided to shoot some photographs in front of an old jacked up Buick. The picture gained Ritts some coverage and he began to be more serious about photography. He photographed Brooke Shields for the cover of the October 12, 1981 edition of Elle and he photographed Olivia Newton-John for her Physical album in 1981. Five years later he replicated that cover pose with Madonna for her 1986 release True Blue. That same year he photographed Tina Turner for the album Break Every Rule.

During the 1980s and 1990s, Ritts photographed celebrities in various locales throughout California. Some of his subjects during this time included musical artists. He also took fashion and nude photographs of models Naomi Campbell, Stephanie Seymour, Tatjana Patitz, Christy Turlington, and Cindy Crawford, including "Tatjana, Veiled Head, Tight View, Joshua Tree, 1988." Ritts' work with them ushered in the 1990s era of the supermodel and was consecrated by one of his most celebrated images, "Stephanie, Cindy, Christy, Tatjana, Naomi, Hollywood, 1989" taken for Rolling Stone magazine.

He also worked for Interview, Esquire, Mademoiselle, Glamour, GQ, Newsweek, Harper's Bazaar, Rolling Stone, Time, Vogue, Allure, Vanity Fair, Details, and Elle. Ritts took publicity portraits for Batman, Batman Forever, and Batman & Robin which appeared on magazine covers and merchandise throughout the 1990s. He published books on photography for various fashion designers.

From 1996 to 1997 Ritts' work was displayed at the Boston Museum of Fine Arts in Boston, attracting more than 250,000 people to the exhibit, and in 2003 a solo exhibition was held at the Daimaru Museum, in Kyoto, Japan.

Personal life 
Ritts was openly gay. He was in a relationship with entertainment lawyer Erik Hyman from 1996 until his death in 2002.

Death 
On December 26, 2002, Ritts died in Los Angeles of complications from pneumonia at the age of 50. According to Ritts' publicist, "Herb was HIV-positive, but this particular pneumonia was not PCP (pneumocystis pneumonia), a common opportunistic infection of AIDS. But at the end of the day, his immune system was compromised."

Music videos

Publications 
 Pictures, Twin Palms, 1988
 Men/Women, Twin Palms, 1989
 Duo, Twin Palms, 1991
 Notorious, Little, Brown and Company/Bulfinch, 1992
 Africa, Little, Brown and Company/Bulfinch, 1994
 Work, Little, Brown and Company/Bulfinch, 1996
 Herb Ritts, Fondation Cartier pour l'Art Contemporain, 1999
 Herb Ritts L.A. Style, Getty, 2012

Exhibitions 
 Herb Ritts: The Rock Portraits, Chrysler Museum of Art, Norfolk, VA, 2016.
 Herb Ritts: The Rock Portraits, Rock and Roll Hall of Fame, Cleveland, OH, 2015/16
 Herb Ritts, Museum of Fine Arts, Boston, MA, 2015
 Herb Ritts: Super, Hamilton's Gallery, London, 2016/17
 Herb Ritts: Super II, Hamilton's Gallery, London, 2017

References

External links 
 
 Herb Ritts on artnet Monographs
 
 Staley Wise Gallery: Herb Ritts collection

1952 births
2002 deaths
20th-century American photographers
21st-century American photographers
AIDS-related deaths in California
Album-cover and concert-poster artists
American erotic photographers
American music video directors
American people of Jewish descent
Bard College alumni
Deaths from pneumonia in California
Fashion photographers
American gay artists
LGBT Jews
American LGBT photographers
Photographers from Los Angeles
Physique photographers
University High School (Los Angeles) alumni
20th-century American LGBT people